Leonardo Galli (born 3 July 1997) is an Italian professional footballer who plays as a midfielder.

Club career
On 2 August 2017, Galli joined Serie D club Pro Patria. The midfielder was part of the team who won the 2017–18 Serie D. He renewed his contract in August 2019.

Honours
Venezia
 Lega Pro: 2016–17
 Coppa Italia Lega Pro: 2016–17

Pro Patria
 Serie D: 2017–18

References

External links
 
 

1997 births
Living people
Sportspeople from Cremona
Footballers from Lombardy
Italian footballers
Association football midfielders
Serie C players
Serie D players
U.S. Cremonese players
Venezia F.C. players
Aurora Pro Patria 1919 players